Gelegjamtsyn Ösökhbayar (also Gelegjamts Usukhbayar, ; born December 13, 1973, in Battsengel sum, Arkhangai aimag) is a retired amateur Mongolian freestyle wrestler, who competed in the men's super heavyweight category. Considered one of Mongolia's top wrestlers in his decade, Gelegjamts has claimed a bronze medal at the 1998 Asian Games in Bangkok, Thailand, picked up the 130-kg title at the 2001 Asian Wrestling Championships in Ulaanbaatar, and also represented his nation Mongolia at the 2004 Summer Olympics.

Gelegjamts highlighted his sporting career at the 1998 Asian Games in Bangkok, Thailand, where he grappled his way over Kazakhstan's Igor Klimov to fetch the bronze medal in the 130-kg division at 1–7. Though he missed a chance to compete the Olympics in 2000, Gelegjamts outclassed Iran's Alireza Rezaei in their final match to clinch his first ever gold in front of the home crowd at the 2001 Asian Wrestling Championships in Ulaanbaatar. Gelegjamts' sporting success continued to thrive at the World Championships and the 2002 Asian Games in Busan, South Korea, but finished outside of medals.

At the 2004 Summer Olympics in Athens, Gelegjamts qualified for his first Mongolian squad, as a 30-year-old, in the men's 120 kg class. Earlier in the process, he received a berth and rounded out the tenth spot in the super heavyweight category from the 2003 World Wrestling Championships in New York City, New York, United States. He opened the prelim pool with a comfortable 7–0 victory over Belarus' Barys Hrynkevich, but fell to his Iranian rival and eventual Olympic silver medalist Alireza Rezaei in their rematch 0–3 in overtime. Gelegjamts was haplessly pinned by Bulgaria's Bozhidar Boyadzhiev on his third match within three minutes, dropping him to third in the pool and placing twelfth in the final standings.

References

External links
 

1973 births
Living people
Mongolian male sport wrestlers
Olympic wrestlers of Mongolia
Wrestlers at the 2004 Summer Olympics
Wrestlers at the 1998 Asian Games
Wrestlers at the 2002 Asian Games
Asian Games medalists in wrestling
People from Battsengel
Asian Games bronze medalists for Mongolia
Medalists at the 1998 Asian Games
20th-century Mongolian people
21st-century Mongolian people